Canadian Pacific 2317 is a class "G-3c" 4-6-2 "Pacific" type steam locomotive built by the Montreal Locomotive Works for the Canadian Pacific Railway.

History

Revenue service
After the end of World War I, the Canadian Pacific Railway began replacing their old wooden passenger cars with “heavyweight” six-axle steel passenger cars. In response to this, the CP's chief mechanical officer, William E. Woodhouse, designed a new class of 4-6-2 “Pacific” type steam locomotive that would be known as the G-3 class. No. 2317 was built in June 1923 by the Montreal Locomotive Works as part of the G-3c subclass, and it was put into service, pulling mainline passenger trains for the CPR. It was known to be stationed in Winnipeg, Manitoba, for a good portion of its revenue career. After serving the CPR for thirty-six years, the locomotive was retired from revenue service in 1959, and it was subsequently put into storage with an uncertain future.

Steamtown
In November 1965, seafood magnate and steam locomotive enthusiast F. Nelson Blount purchased the locomotive and moved it to Bellows Falls, Vermont, to join the rest of his Steamtown, U.S.A. collection. Upon arrival, the engine received a cosmetic restoration and was put on static display with the other CPR locomotives, including 4-4-4 No. 2929 and 4-6-4 No. 2816.

In 1976, CPR No. 1278 was removed from the active roster due to the expiration of its flue time. Instead of overhauling No. 1278, Steamtown chose to rebuild No. 2317, since it was found to be in excellent condition at the time, and it was a more powerful locomotive to pull Steamtown's longer trains. Steamtown crews began restoration work on No. 2317 in March 1976 with the hopes of bringing it back to service as quickly as possible, since a locomotive was needed to pull a bicentennial train known as the Vermont Bicentennial Steam Expedition sponsored by the State of Vermont. However, due to weight restrictions on some wooden bridges the train meant to run on, restoration work on No. 2317 was halted, and CPR No. 1293 was selected to pull the train, instead.

The rebuilding process on No. 2317 resumed in June 1978, with the hopes of bringing it back to service by the Annual Railfan's Weekend in October of that year. On October 1, 1978, the locomotive was fired up for the first time in nineteen years, and it joined CPR Numbers 1293 and 1246 in Steamtown's operating fleet. During this time, the locomotive was painted in the Canadian Pacific gray-blue and Tuscan red livery, a livery it never sported in revenue service. Throughout the 1983 operating season, the engine, along with Numbers 1246 and 1293, were used to pull multiple excursion trips to bid farewell to Steamtown's home in Bellows Falls, before the entire collection would be moved to Scranton, Pennsylvania, the following year. The locomotive arrived in Scranton on January 31, 1984, and it was subsequently fired up four days later for the "Grand Entrance Ceremony" on February 4.

The locomotive was fired up once more on September 1 for the first Steamtown excursion in Scranton, which ran on the former Delaware, Lackawanna and Western (DLW) mainline between Scranton and Elmhurst, Pennsylvania. In 1986, it was painted up in the DLW’s "Pocono Mountain Route" livery. It remained in this livery, until after the National Park Service (NPS) acquired Steamtown in 1987. The locomotive was subsequently repainted into the livery it wore in active service with CPR.

The locomotive was present at the grand opening of Steamtown National Historic Site along with several other locomotives, including Baldwin Locomotive Works 26, Canadian National 3254, Reading Blue Mountain and Northern Railroad 425, New York, Susquehanna and Western’s Ex-China Railways SY No. 142, and Milwaukee Road 261, and the locomotive ran several excursion trains on the former DLW main line. The locomotive subsequently settled down as Steamtown’s main workhorse, and it would often pull Steamtown's excursions in tandem with No. 3254 until 2004, when problems with its trailing truck, dry pipe, and tires were discovered. Between 2004 and 2007, it only pulled the "Scranton Limited" yard shuttle trains. After new tires were installed in 2007, the locomotive was allowed to pull a few of the longer excursions to East Stroudsburg, Pennsylvania, and the Delaware Water Gap.

Disposition
After the end of the 2009 operating season, it was used only sparingly as its flue-time was close to expiring. No. 2317 made its last run on September 5, 2010, during Steamtown's 2010 Lackawanna Railfest. After the event, the locomotive was placed into storage in the Steamtown Roundhouse where it is viewable to the public, it was previously waiting for Federal Railroad Administration (FRA) mandated 1,472-day inspection and repairs to operate again. Steamtown originally planned to return No. 2317 to service again once the restoration of Boston and Maine 3713 was completed. As of 2022, however, the locomotive still remains on static display, and Steamtown has stated that they have no plans on returning No. 2317 to service again anytime soon, since the locomotive is in poor mechanical condition and would require a more expensive overhaul in order for it to run again. No. 3713 will be replacing both No. 2317 and No. 3254 as Steamtown's main attraction for mainline excursion trains.

Accidents and incidents 
On February 4, 1982, the Steamtown shop and storage building collapsed under the weight of three feet of heavy, wet snow caused some damage to some locomotives, including No. 2317. However, the damage was not serious enough to remove it from excursion service.

On July 10, 1995, No. 2317 was returning a nine-car excursion carrying 572 passengers from Moscow to Scranton at 20 miles per hour, when it struck and killed two young boys (Paul Paskert, aged 12 and Anthony Paskert, aged 16), who were trying to pry one of their jammed ATVs from the tracks. The engineers were not able to see the boys on the tracks, and did not apply emergency brakes to avoid causing passengers to be thrown from their seats and injured. This was the 26th excursion run since the grand opening of the new park less than a month prior, and this was the first fatality Steamtown experienced since July 4, 1985, when an intoxicated woman was struck by a private venture train.

On October 27, 2003, No. 2317 was pulling a train through the Poconos at about 10 miles an hour, when the tender and three of the nine passenger cars jumped the tracks. Fortunately, no one was injured, because the train was traveling at such a slow speed. The accident occurred one mile outside Delaware Water Gap in an area known as Point of Gap.

Gallery

See also 

 Canadian Pacific 1201
 Canadian Pacific 1293
 Canadian Pacific 2816
 U.S. Sugar 148
 Atlantic Coast Line 1504
 Southern Railway 1401

References

Bibliography

External links
Canadian Pacific 2317

4-6-2 locomotives
Preserved steam locomotives of Canada
2317
MLW locomotives
Railway locomotives introduced in 1923
Standard gauge locomotives of Canada
Standard gauge locomotives of the United States
Preserved steam locomotives of Pennsylvania